The Renault R.S.19 is a Formula One racing car designed and constructed by the Renault F1 Team to compete during the 2019 FIA Formula One World Championship. The chassis was designed by Nick Chester, Chris Cooney, Martin Tolliday, Simon Virrill and Pete Machin with Marcin Budkowski overseeing the design and production of the car as executive technical director and Rémi Taffin leading the powertrain design. The car was driven by Nico Hülkenberg and Daniel Ricciardo. The car made its competitive debut at the 2019 Australian Grand Prix.

Season notes
A tough first part of the season for Renault saw them only scoring 39 points in the first 12 rounds; 43 less than what they did at the same point in 2018. This resulted them sitting 6th in the Constructors' Championship at the mid-season break.

After Racing Point's protest against Renault's innovative brake balance adjustment system, which didn't break any rule from the technical regulations, but failed to comply with one of the rules written in the sporting regulations ("Driver must drive the car alone and unaided."), the French team was disqualified from the  results. The system automatically changed the brake balance as the car drove around the track. At the end of the season, Renault finished 5th in the Constructors' Championship.

Renault performed particularly well in most power circuits. In Canada they were comfortably best of the rest, finishing sixth and seventh. Daniel Ricciardo was able to fight and hold off Valtteri Bottas in a much faster Mercedes for a few laps. In the Italian Grand Prix they managed to beat both Red Bulls and Ferrari driver Sebastian Vettel (although helped by the fact that he spun in the early stages of the race), to take  a comfortable 4th and 5th.

Design and development
For the  season Renault  signed Daniel Ricciardo who partnered Nico Hülkenberg. Renault's managing director Cyril Abiteboul said that the gains they made in the engine side were the biggest since 2016. The team brought new updates to the car throughout the season.

At the end of the season, Renault F1 Team announced changes to the aerodynamic department of their team as a result of the R.S.19's failures. Chassis Technical Director Nick Chester would leave the team, with former Ferrari and McLaren chassis engineer Pat Fry and former Williams and Ferrari aerodynamicist Dirk de Beer to join the team.

Complete Formula One results
(key)

 Driver failed to finish the race, but was classified as they had completed over 90% of the winner's race distance.

References

R.S.19
2019 Formula One season cars